Patricia Ortega (Venezuelan , born 1977) is a Venezuelan film director. She has won multiple accolades, particularly for her 2018 film Being Impossible.

Early life
Ortega says that she has been a movie lover since she was young, and so the decision to become a filmmaker was natural. She has studied journalism at university.

Career
Ortega studied at the Escuela Internacional de Cine y Televisión in Cuba, specialising in Film Direction.

After creating some short films, Ortega became president of the independent Venezuelan production company Mandrágora Films in 2009. In the next ten years, she made ten short fiction and documentary films with the company; in 2013 she directed her first feature film, El regreso (English: The Return), which saw a wide commercial release in cinemas across Venezuela. 

Her second feature film, Being Impossible (Spanish: Yo, imposible), however, did well internationally and has yet to be released in her home nation. 
Ortega has drawn strength from Being Impossible during times of both personal and political upheaval.  She found out that Being Impossible would be screening at the US film festival South by Southwest on the same day that Juan Guaidó was declared Acting President of Venezuela; she found the news of the screening "beautiful", but this was overwhelmed by the political situation that "worried" her. Ortega won the Best Director and Best Screenplay awards at the Venezuelan Film Festival in June 2019 for Being Impossible.

In 2019, she began development of her third feature film, Mamacruz.

Personal life
Ortega was raised in a religious Catholic family, and says that she was always the black sheep of the family who did not follow traditional roles. She is divorced, and has lived in Porlamar on the Venezuelan Caribbean island of Margarita since January 2019.

Filmography
 Pasajes (2004)
 Al otro lado del mar (2006)
 The Return (2013)
 Being Impossible (2018)
 Mamacruz (2023)

Awards and nominations

References

External links

1977 births
Living people
Venezuelan film directors
Venezuelan women film directors
People from Maracaibo
Former Roman Catholics